Frank Ivic was a U.S. soccer defender who earned one cap with the U.S. national team in a 1–0 win over Poland on August 12, 1973. He played club soccer for N.Y. Croatia.

References

American soccer players
United States men's international soccer players
Possibly living people
Year of birth missing
Association football defenders